Jan Nils Johan Nygren (10 April 1934 – 28 November 2019) was a Swedish actor, well known for his role as Karlsson (Karlsson's voice) in Karlsson-on-the-Roof.

Selected filmography
1973 - Emil och griseknoen
1973 - Någonstans i Sverige (TV)
1974 - Världens bästa Karlsson (as Karlsson-on-the-Roof's voice)
1975 - Egg! Egg! A Hardboiled Story
1977 - Bröderna Lejonhjärta
1979 - Du är inte klok, Madicken
1980 - Sverige åt svenskarna
1981 - Babels hus (TV)
1982 - Jönssonligan & Dynamit-Harry
1983 - Profitörerna (TV)
1985 - Peter-No-Tail in Americat
1986 - Hassel – Beskyddarna
1988 - Kråsnålen (TV)
1991 - "Harry Lund" lägger näsan i blöt!
1991 - Den ofrivillige golfaren
1993 - Sökarna
1994 - Den vite riddaren (TV)
1996 - Monopol

References

External links

1934 births
2019 deaths
Swedish male film actors
Place of birth missing
Swedish male television actors